The 1962 World Series was the championship series of Major League Baseball's (MLB) 1962 season. The 59th edition of the World Series, it was a best-of-seven playoff that matched the defending American League (AL) and World Series champion New York Yankees against the National League (NL) champion San Francisco Giants. The Yankees won the series in seven games for the 20th championship in team history. It is best remembered for its dramatic conclusion in Game 7; with runners on second and third base and two outs in the bottom of the ninth inning, the Giants’ Willie McCovey hit a hard line drive that was caught by Yankees second baseman Bobby Richardson to preserve New York's one-run victory. Yankees pitcher Ralph Terry was named the World Series Most Valuable Player.

The Giants had won their first NL pennant since 1954 and first since moving from New York in 1958.  They advanced by defeating the Los Angeles Dodgers in a three-game playoff.  The Giants had a higher cumulative batting average (.226 to .199) and lower earned run average (2.66 to 2.95), had more hits (51 to 44), runs (21 to 20), hit more home runs (5 to 3), triples (2 to 1) and doubles (10 to 6), yet lost the Series. They would not return to the World Series for another 27 years.

The Yankees had won their first World Series in 1923; of the 40 Series played between 1923 and 1962, the Yankees won half. After a long dominance of the World Series picture, the Yankees would not win another World Series for 15 years despite appearances in 1963, 1964, and 1976.

This World Series, which was closely matched in every game, is also remembered for its then-record length of 13 days, caused by postponements due to rain in both cities.

Summary

NOTE: the series was originally scheduled to begin October 3, but was moved back one day due to the three-game playoff between the Giants and Dodgers to determine the National League pennant.
†: postponed from October 9 due to rain
††: postponed from October 11 due to rain

Matchups

Game 1

Chuck Hiller's double and Felipe Alou's single in the third tied the game, but the Yankees broke the tie in the seventh on Clete Boyer's home run. Next inning, Dale Long followed a single and hit-by-pitch with an RBI single to make it 4–2 Yankees and knock O'Dell out of the game. Boyer's sacrifice fly off Don Larsen extended their lead to 5–2. The Yankees got a final run in the ninth on Elston Howard's RBI single off Stu Miller, the run charged to Larsen. Ford's complete-game victory was the first of six in the series, four for the Yankees and two for the Giants.

Game 2

The Giants scored two runs in Game 2, in the first when Chuck Hiller hit a leadoff double off Ralph Terry and scored on two ground outs, then in the seventh when Willie McCovey smashed a tremendous home run over the right-field fence to boost 24-game winner Jack Sanford to a 2–0 shutout of the Yankees, who managed only three hits.

Game 3

The Yankees ended a scoreless tie in the seventh with three runs. After two leadoff singles, Roger Maris drove a base hit off starter Billy Pierce for two runs, then after moving to third on a sacrifice fly, he scored the eventual winning run on Clete Boyer's groundout off Don Larsen when the Giants were unable to turn an inning-ending double play. Giants catcher Ed Bailey's two-run home run in the top of the ninth off Bill Stafford left them a run short.

Game 4

For the second time in as many games, a Giants catcher stroked a two-run home run, when Tom Haller hit one off Whitey Ford in the second inning. After the Yankees tied the score at 2–2 in the sixth on back-to-back walks off reliever Bobby Bolin followed by back-to-back RBI singles by Bill Skowron and Clete Boyer, second baseman Chuck Hiller hit the first National League grand slam in World Series history in the seventh off Marshall Bridges with two of the runs charged to reliever Jim Coates. The Giants scored another run in the ninth off Bridges when Matty Alou hit a leadoff single, moved to second on a sacrifice bunt, and scored on Chuck Hiller's single. The Yankees got that run back on three straight two-out singles off Billy O'Dell, the last an RBI single by Tom Tresh, but Mickey Mantle hit into a forceout to end the game as the Giants won 7–3. This game marked the only World Series appearance for Juan Marichal, who started for the Giants. Marichal smashed the thumb on his pitching hand while attempting to bunt in the top of the fifth, and was placed on the disabled list for the remainder of the series.

Don Larsen was the winning pitcher in relief, six years to the day after (and in the same stadium of) his perfect game in the 1956 World Series.

The Yankees' win tied the series at two games apiece and guaranteed a return trip to San Francisco.

Game 5

Games 5 and 6 were postponed by rain. Game 5 at New York was pushed back one day, but Game 6 in San Francisco was pushed back four days due to torrential rain on the West Coast. Three of the longest World Series in terms of total days, due to various postponements, involved the Giants: the 1911 and the 1989 were the other two.

In Game 5, hot-hitting José Pagán hit a leadoff single in the third off Ralph Terry, moved to second on a sacrifice bunt, then scored on Chuck Hiller's RBI single. After a wild pitch from Jack Sanford tied the game in the fourth, Pagan's home run in the fifth put the Giants back in front 2–1, but another wild pitch in the sixth by Sanford tied the game again. In the eighth, Bobby Richardson and Tony Kubek hit back-to-back singles before Tom Tresh hit the game-winning three-run home run. The Giants scored a run in the ninth when Willie McCovey hit a leadoff single and scored on Tom Haller's one-out double, but Terry retired the next two hitters to end the game. With the series returning to San Francisco the Yankees had the edge, three games to two, only to have the sixth game delayed four days by rain.

Game 6

In a battle of left-handed starting pitchers, Billy Pierce outdueled Whitey Ford with a complete-game three-hitter as the Giants evened the series at three wins apiece with a 5–2 victory. They struck first in the fourth when after a single and walk, an error on an attempted pickoff by Ford allowed a run to score, then Orlando Cepeda's double and Jim Davenport's single scored a run each. They added to their lead next inning on RBI singles by Felipe Alou and Cepeda. The Yankees' only runs came on a Maris home run in the fifth inning and an RBI single by Tony Kubek in the eighth inning after a one-out double.

Game 7

The only run of this classic game came in the fifth inning when Tony Kubek grounded into a double play, Bill Skowron scoring from third. Ralph Terry, pitching the seventh game instead of Jim Bouton because of the rain delays, had given up Bill Mazeroski's Series-winning walk-off home run two years earlier in Pittsburgh, but in his third start stifled the Giants' power hitters. In the bottom of the ninth, pinch-hitter Matty Alou, batting for reliever Billy O'Dell, led off the inning with a bunt hit after first having a foul ball dropped, but Terry struck out the next two batters, Felipe Alou and Hiller. Mays hit a double into the right-field corner, but Maris played the carom well, then hit cutoff man Richardson with a throw that was quickly relayed home. Alou, aware of Maris' strong arm, stopped at third. Facing Willie McCovey with two outs, Terry elected to pitch to him rather than walk the bases loaded, which would have brought up slugger Orlando Cepeda. Terry's inside fastball on the second pitch handcuffed McCovey, who nonetheless adjusted his bat in mid-swing to extend his arms and hit what he later claimed was the hardest ball he had ever struck. The line drive appeared at first to be going over the head of a well-positioned Richardson, but was in fact sinking from topspin and Richardson made the catch without leaping to end the game and the series. Had Richardson not made the catch, McCovey's hit would have driven in Alou for the tying run and quite possibly Mays as the winning run. Terry was named the World Series MVP.

The Yankees won their 20th World Series; they would not win another until 1977. The Giants would not win another National League pennant until 1989, when they would lose the World Series to the Oakland A's in a series interrupted by a major earthquake. San Francisco returned to the World Series in 2002 but lost in seven games to the Anaheim Angels.  The San Francisco Giants would finally win the World Series for the first time in 2010 (against Texas) their first since 1954 when they were still located in New York. They would go on to win two more in 2012 (against Detroit) and again in 2014 (against Kansas City).

Composite box
1962 World Series (4–3): New York Yankees (A.L.) over San Francisco Giants (N.L.)

Quotes

Aftermath
The season was a high-mark for Dark in San Francisco, despite some close brushes for further success. Despite winning 88 and 90 games in the next two years, the Giants could only take solace in finishing in the top division of the National League (until division play was instituted in 1969), and Dark was fired after the 1964 season; until 1972, the Giants would finish fourth or better but not win another pennant until 1989. The Yankees would win two further pennants in the 1960s, which included trips to the Series for Houk and then Berra when the former moved to the front office; the Yankees lost both times before the Yankee dynasty soon began to crumble under the chains of retiring players and new management, which resulted in a decade long drought.

For the Peanuts comic strip of December 22, 1962, cartoonist and Giants fan Charles M. Schulz depicted Charlie Brown sitting glumly with Linus, lamenting in the last panel, "Why couldn't McCovey have hit the ball just three feet higher?" The January 28, 1963, strip featured a nearly identical scene, except in the last panel Charlie Brown moaned, "Or why couldn't McCovey have hit the ball even two feet higher?"

During the 1981 Major League Baseball strike, Giants radio flagship KNBR rebroadcast Game 7, electronically re-editing NBC Radio announcer George Kell's description to make it sound as if McCovey's ninth-inning liner had gotten past Richardson, with Alou and Mays scoring to win the game and Series for San Francisco.

During Ring Night ceremonies in April 2011, Mays, McCovey, and Cepeda received honorary 2010 World Series rings.

Notes

References

See also
1962 Japan Series

External links

 Kodak Presents – Baseball's 25 Greatest Moments: Willie McCovey Lines Out 

World Series
World Series
New York Yankees postseason
San Francisco Giants postseason
Baseball competitions in San Francisco
World Series
World Series
World Series
World Series
Baseball competitions in New York City
1960s in the Bronx